Deadstock Coffee is a Black-owned coffee company based in Portland, Oregon. The business operates a coffee shop in the Old Town Chinatown neighborhood and sells beans online.

Description
Deadstock bills itself as "snob-free" and uses the slogan "Coffee should be dope". Drinks include the Steph Curry (white chocolate mocha), the Lebronald Palmer (mixture of coffee, sweet tea, and lemonade), and the Luther Vandross (lavender mocha). Drinks can be topped with stenciled sneakers (Adidas, Jordans, Nikes, or Reebok). The chai lattes are made with One Stripe Chai.

History
The business began as a cart and has operated a sneaker-themed coffee shop in the Old Town Chinatown neighborhood since August 2015. In 2020, the business saw a spike in business, and owner Ian Williams confirmed plans to open a location at Alberta Alley, a new development in northeast Portland.

Reception
In 2020, Williams was included in Portland Business Journal top 40 under 40 list. Nick Townsend included Deadstock in Eater Portland 2021 list of "11 Places to Find Charming Chai Lattes in Portland".

See also 

 List of Black-owned restaurants

References

External links

 

Black-owned companies of the United States
Coffee companies of the United States
Coffee in Portland, Oregon
Companies based in Portland, Oregon
Food carts in Portland, Oregon
Northwest Portland, Oregon
Old Town Chinatown
Restaurants in Portland, Oregon